Belgarus (also Romanized as Belgarūs; also known as Belgares, Bolgores, and Bolgoros) is a village in Margha Rural District, in the Central District of Izeh County, Khuzestan Province, Iran. At the 2006 census, its population was 252, in 42 families.

References 

Populated places in Izeh County